Cordula is a 1950 Austrian drama film directed by Gustav Ucicky and starring Paula Wessely, Attila Hörbiger and Jane Tilden. It is based on a 1925 poem by Anton Wildgans about a woman in a small town who falls pregnant to a local forester serving in the Austrian Army during the First World War.

The film was the made by Wessely's independent production company, and was the sixth time she had appeared in a film directed by Usicky. It was partly shot on location in the vicinity of Vorau in Styria, using locals as extras. Interiors were shot at the Sievering Studios in Vienna with sets designed by the art director Otto Niedermoser.

Cast

References

External links

1950 drama films
Austrian drama films
Films directed by Gustav Ucicky
Films set on the Austro-Hungarian home front during World War I
Films based on poems
Films shot at Sievering Studios
Austrian black-and-white films
1950s German-language films